Air Senegal , is the flag carrier of the Republic of Senegal. Created in 2016, it is state owned through investment arm Caisse des Dépots et Consignation du Sénégal. It is based at Blaise Diagne International Airport in Dakar, Senegal.

History 
The airline was created in 2016 to replace bankrupt carrier Senegal Airlines, which was under liquidation. The new national airline is part of a large, 20-year horizon investment plan referred to as Plan Sénégal Émergent (PSE) initiated by President Macky Sall. Air Senegal aims to be the leader in West African air transport. The airline is headed by Philippe Bohn, a former vice president of Airbus. It is advised by the financial advisory conglomerate Lazard.

On 29 April 2018, the airline received its Air Operator's Certificate (AOC), and commenced domestic flights on 14 May 2018 with a fleet of two brand new ATR72-600s. In the fourth quarter of 2018, it leased two Airbus A319s from Lessors Avolon and Apollo and started deploying to several regional destinations. The airline added a third A319 jet in June 2019 to serve regional destinations, including Abidjan, Cotonou and Conakry.

The airline ordered two long-haul wide-body Airbus A330-900s in November 2017 at the Dubai Air Show. It became the first African acquirer of this new type of aircraft. The first plane arrived in January 2019 after a delivery flight from Toulouse and launched the daily Dakar–Paris route.

In November 2019, at the 2019 Dubai Air Show, a Memorandum of Understanding was signed for 8 Airbus A220-300 regional jets, the airline's largest order so far. According to CEO Ibrahima Kane, "[They] will contribute to develop our long haul network to Europe and our regional network in Africa", with routes to London, Geneva and Lagos expected to be launched. The first A220 is expected to be delivered in 2021, and upon delivery Air Senegal will become the third African airline to operate the Airbus A220 after Air Tanzania and EgyptAir, and the first airline in West Africa to operate them.

The end of 2019 saw big expansion for the carrier. In mid-November the airline strengthened its domestic links with a new route to Cap Skirring using its ATR 72-600s, its second domestic route after Ziguinchor. There was also expansion in the long haul sector with the arrival of a 2nd A330-900, which enabled the airline to begin flights to Marseille and Barcelona, the airline's first destination in Spain.
The addition of 2 Boeing 737-500s on lease from Romanian airline Blue Air allowed Air Senegal to launch new routes to multiple countries in Western Africa, including Casablanca in Morocco, Ghana's capital city Accra, in addition to Abuja and Lagos in Nigeria.

Expansion was abruptly halted in March 2020 due to the onset of the COVID-19 pandemic, causing Air Senegal to temporarily suspend operations. At the time, the airline was poised to commence flights to a pair of new European destinations - Geneva and London. No update has been provided yet on when these routes will be commenced, though in a May 2021 interview it was hinted by Ibrahima Kane that they could be seen with the arrival of the Airbus A220s that the airline is due to receive in 2021. At the end of 2020 Air Senegal received its first Airbus A321, with a second arriving in February 2021. These 2 aircraft helped launch new routes again, this time to Milan in Italy, the airline's first Italian route, as well as Lyon in southern France. These routes began in February and March respectively. April saw the end of the lease on the 737-500s, with the second aircraft, YR-AMD, being returned to Blue Air where it has been parked at the carrier's base in Bucharest.

A significant step in the airline's growth came with the announcement of its plans to fly to the United States for the first time from September 2021. It's reported that New York will be served direct by the airline's Airbus A330neos, before making the short hop to the Washington D.C./Baltimore metropolitan area. The twice-weekly route will serve John F. Kennedy International Airport and continues to Baltimore/Washington International Airport.

Corporate affairs

Business  figures
Air Senegal does not make financial data available to the public. However, figures have been made available via press reports, interviews and other publications from time to time. The airline received a bailout of €68 million from the Government of Senegal in 2020 to cover its losses.

Associations and memberships
In September 2019, Air Senegal was admitted as a member of the African Airlines Association (AFRAA).

Destinations
As of April 2021, Air Senegal operated to the following destinations:

 Sierra Leone - [Freetown]- Lungai International Airport

Fleet

, Air Senegal operates the following aircraft:

References

Airlines of Senegal
Airlines established in 2016
2016 establishments in Senegal
Organisations based in Dakar